The Corydon Wassell House is a historic house at 2005 South Scott Street in Little Rock, Arkansas.  Built in 1882, it is a -story wood-frame cottage, with modest Late Victorian trim, and is architecturally typical for the neighborhood.  It is nationally significant as the home of the doctor and missionary Corydon M. Wassell (1884-1958).  Wassell was awarded the Navy Cross for his service during World War II, and his life was immortalized in the film The Story of Dr. Wassell.

The house was listed on the National Register of Historic Places in 2000.

See also
National Register of Historic Places listings in Little Rock, Arkansas

References

Houses on the National Register of Historic Places in Arkansas
Queen Anne architecture in Arkansas
Houses completed in 1882
Houses in Little Rock, Arkansas